Tim Pappas (born September 14, 1973 in New York City) is an American racing driver and businessman who competes in the American Le Mans Series with his Black Swan Racing team. He won the 2010 and 2011 American Le Mans Series GTC Drivers Championships and is the president of Pappas Enterprises Inc., his family's four-decade old real estate company.

Early racing career
Pappas began his professional driving career in 2000 in Continental Tire Sports Car Challenge competition before making select Rolex Sports Car Series starts. In 2005, he drove a BMW 330i to two podiums and six top-ten finishes in the Continental Tire Sports Car Challenge

American Le Mans Series
In 2007, Pappas made his debut in the American Le Mans Series with his Team Trans Sport organization. Making 11 starts in his rookie season with Terry Borcheller in a Porsche 911 GT3 RSR, Pappas scored a season-best fourth-place finish in the GT2 category at the Petit Le Mans, while collecting four top-five finishes in total.

Running under the Black Swan Racing banner, Pappas debuted a new Doran Ford GT-R for 2008, making six starts in the GT2 category with co-driver Anthony Lazzaro.

Pappas and his Black Swan team took one year off before moving to the newly formed GTC category in 2010, earning his and the team's first class championship after four wins and eight podium finishes in as many starts. In 2011, Pappas and regular co-driver Jeroen Bleekemolen repeated as GTC champions with another four class victories and three second-place finishes in nine starts.

The 2012 season saw Pappas and Black Swan step up to P2 with a Lola B11/80 Honda, leased from Level 5 Motorsports. While kicking off the season with a podium at the 2012 12 Hours of Sebring an early race accident in the second round of the season at Long Beach led to the team withdrawing from P2 competition due to a lack of spare parts amid Lola's financial administration.

Personal life
Pappas is the president of Pappas Enterprises Inc., his family's four-decade old real estate company based in Boston, Massachusetts. Additionally, Pappas holds a film degree from New York University.

Complete IMSA SportsCar Championship results
(key) (Races in bold indicate pole position) (Races in italics indicate fastest lap)

24 Hours of Le Mans results

References

External links
Tim Pappas Career Statistics

1973 births
Living people
Sportspeople from Boston
American Le Mans Series drivers
Racing drivers from New York City
24 Hours of Daytona drivers
WeatherTech SportsCar Championship drivers
24 Hours of Le Mans drivers
24H Series drivers
Porsche Motorsports drivers
Michelin Pilot Challenge drivers